Sant Gervasi – Galvany is a neighborhood in the Sarrià-Sant Gervasi district of Barcelona, Catalonia (Spain). The Galvany name became popular when the market Galvany was built, located between the neighborhood streets Santaló, Calaf, Amigó and Madrazo, and the market has a plaque on the facade of Santaló street recalling that Josep Galvany Castelló gave the land on which the market was built to the municipality.

It occupies the area between Av. Diagonal, Av. de Sarrià, General Mitre, Balmes and Via Augusta. This area corresponds approximately to the neighbourhood of Lledó which took its name from the old Mas Lledó in the division of neighbourhoods approved by the Sant Gervasi town hall in 1879.

The population of the neighborhood are mainly of upper class extraction and the oldest part is around the streets of Sagués i Amigó. From the 1950s onwards numerous new buildings have been constructed, the most luxurious of which are to be found in Muntaner street.

Today it is a neighborhood with a lively nightlife due to the large number of bars, restaurants and nightspots, especially around Santaló and the surrounding streets.

The nearby  is covered in a separate article in the Spanish Wikipedia.

Neighbourhoods of Barcelona
Sarrià-Sant Gervasi